The  is a high-performance hot hatch variant of the E210 series Corolla compact hatchback. The vehicle is manufactured by Toyota with assistance from the company's Gazoo Racing (GR) performance division.

The GR Corolla was introduced on March 31, 2022. The GR Corolla is built mainly for the North American market as Europe received the GR Yaris (which is not sold in Canada and the United States). Both vehicles are assembled at the "GR Factory" inside the Motomachi plant, a production line dedicated to GR-branded vehicles. Aside from North America, the GR Corolla is also sold in Japan, Thailand (limited to nine units), and Malaysia. It will be sold later in Australia, New Zealand, Brazil, and South Africa.

Overview 
In 2020, Toyota unveiled the GR Yaris, a hatchback developed by the company's Gazoo Racing (GR) division for its World Rally Championship (WRC) team. It is not sold in the United States and Canada because the regular Yaris, upon which it is nominally based, isn't sold in those markets due to lack of demand.

The decision led to years of speculation that Toyota would eventually bring a hot hatch to the United States and Canada. The introduction of the vehicle was delayed by a year, because Toyota CEO Akio Toyoda, an accomplished racing driver, was not satisfied with the tuning of a prototype, and asked the GR team to make changes. Development of the vehicle was led by chief engineer Naoyuki Sakamoto.

On March 31, 2022, the GR Corolla was introduced, which while based on the larger E210 series Corolla compact hatchback, includes several features originally developed for the GR Yaris. The vehicle is powered by the 1.6-liter G16E-GTS turbocharged straight-three engine that powers the GR Yaris. Among other strategies to achieve this increased power output, the GR Corolla's engine uses larger exhaust valves and three tailpipes for reduced backpressure. A six-speed manual transmission is standard in the GR Corolla.

The GR Corolla also uses the GR-Four all-wheel drive system first developed for the GR Yaris. The standard setting is a 60:40 front to rear torque distribution, but it can go as rear-wheel biased as 30:70.

The vehicle is equipped with Toyota Safety Sense 3.0 suite of advanced driver-assistance systems and Toyota's updated audio multimedia system that debuted on the XK70 series Tundra.

The GR Corolla is produced alongside the GR Yaris at the "GR Factory" inside Toyota's Motomachi plant. Unlike most automobile plants, the "GR Factory" does not use a conveyor belt assembly line. Instead, vehicles are built at stations with more manual assembly processes. The "GR Factory" employs experienced technicians recruited from throughout the company.

Special editions

Circuit Edition 
The Circuit Edition is an exclusive model for the first model year of the GR Corolla in North America, which offers performance upgrades such as Torsen limited-slip differentials for the front and rear axles (optional for the Core trim level). It also offers a forged carbon fiber roof, hood bulge with functional vents, matte-black rear spoiler, and other upgrades.

Morizo Edition 

The Morizo Edition (stylized "MORIZO") is a limited-production "track-ready" variant of the GR Corolla with reduced weight, increased performance figures, and enhanced handling, which is both available in Japan and North America. To improve handling, the suspension was re-tuned with monotube shock absorbers,  wider tires on lighter rims were used, and body rigidity was increased with 349 additional spot welds, over an additional  of structural adhesive, and body reinforcement braces. Engineers adjusted the transmission gear ratios, differential gear ratio and engine tuning to support sustained acceleration at peak torque on the Morizo Edition.

The special edition was named after "Morizo", the pseudonym used by Toyota CEO Akio Toyoda when participating in races.

References

External links 

 GR Corolla – Toyota Gazoo Racing
 GR Corolla – Toyota USA

GR
Cars introduced in 2022
Compact cars
Hot hatches
All-wheel-drive vehicles